Arsinoe, sometimes called Arsinoe Epidires, was an ancient city of the Avalitæ, at Dire promontory in Eritrea, north of Berenice Epideires, and near the entrance of the Red Sea (Bab-el-Mandeb). The city was founded by Ptolemy II and named for Arsinoe II of Egypt, his wife and sister. Its location is near the modern-day city of Asseb, in Eritrea.

References

External links
 Hazlitt, Classical Gazetteer, p. 52

Populated places established in the 3rd century BC
History of Eritrea
Ptolemaic colonies in the Red Sea
Former populated places in Eritrea
Ancient Greek geography of East Africa